Salay, officially the Municipality of Salay, is a 4th class municipality in the province of Misamis Oriental, Philippines. According to the 2020 census, it has a population of 29,998 people. The town is known for its handmade paper and papercrafts, similar to washi, but made with indigenous fibers.

Poblacion is the center of Salay and had been governed by the Capistrano politicians until the 2007 elections. Lanzones is one of the major source of income among Salayanos aside from commerce at Poblacion and fishing to other people. May 1 is the official feast day of Salay although March feast is also celebrated and is the original.

Salay Central School provides primary education to the graders in this town while the nearby Salay National High School provides the secondary education, the latter has been nationally recognized for quality education among public schools.

Geography

Barangays
Salay is politically subdivided into 18 barangays.

Climate

Demographics

Economy

Transportation
On February 16, 2022, the new Salay Terminal II was officially opened when it fully operational. It caters buses to and from Butuan/Cagayan de Oro.

References

External links
 [ Philippine Standard Geographic Code]
Philippine Census Information
Local Governance Performance Management System

Municipalities of Misamis Oriental